Wola Potocka  is a village in the administrative district of Gmina Potok Wielki, within Janów Lubelski County, Lublin Voivodeship, in eastern Poland.

References

Wola Potocka